Crabwalk is a 2002 novel by Danzig-born German author Günter Grass.

Crabwalk or crab walk may also refer to:

 Crab walk, the typical locomotion of a crab
 Crab walk or crab crawl, used in crawl soccer
 "Crabwalk", a song by British musical duo Everything but the Girl from the 1984 album Eden

See also
 Sidle (disambiguation)